Louis the Child is an American electronic music group consisting of Robby Hauldren and Frederic J. Kennett.

Career
Robert David Hauldren was born on September 7, 1996 to David and Julia Hauldren.  He attended one academic year at the University of Southern California where he joined the Beta-Sigma chapter of Tau Kappa Epsilon fraternity before opting to take a leave and further pursue music. Hauldren primarily DJed and made mashups under the alias Haul Pass throughout 2011.
Frederic Judson Kennett was born on October 19, 1997 to Jon and Anne Kennett. He focused on musical production under the alias Fatboy, while completing high school. Though both musicians were students at New Trier High School in Winnetka, IL (Hauldren in the class of 2015 and Kennett in the class of 2016), the two met at a Madeon concert in 2012.

Louis the Child started playing at small venues through 2013 and 2014. In 2015, the band rose in popularity with the release of their single "It's Strange". Freddy Kennet was 17 at the time and still in high school. Robby Hauldren was beginning his freshman year at the University of Southern California. The single garnered praise from artists such as Taylor Swift, who added "It's Strange" as one of her "Songs that Will Make Life Awesome" and was featured on the FIFA 16 soundtrack. "It's Strange" was later featured in a commercial for the 2019 Nissan Kicks. They later opened for artists such as Madeon and The Chainsmokers. The duo embarked on their own tour on October 17, 2015, starting in Chicago.

In December 2016, Louis The Child joined force with Pell and created the band Pellican Child, whose first single, "Turn Me Down", was released ahead of a six-track EP due for early 2017. Louis The Child was the opening act for the European leg of the Shelter Live Tour.

In 2017, the duo headlined a 32 show tour with support from Joey Purp, Lauv, Louis Futon, Prince Fox, Ashe, Party Pupils, Point Point, and Win & Woo, during which they made various contributions including playing a sold-out Thanksgiving show at the Aragon Ballroom. In late 2017, Louis the Child's song "Go" was featured in a TV commercial for the Apple iPad Pro.

In early 2018 they made an appearance at Lollapalooza South America. The festival took place in Chile, Argentina and Brazil. On April 10, 2018, the duo announced the release of their new single, "Better Not" featuring Australian singer, Wafia. As of April 2019, the track has garnered over 100 million streams on Spotify.

The duo's emergence continued in 2019 when it announced a performance at the Red Rocks Amphitheatre and a concert coinciding with the X Games.

The duo have repeatedly attributed their decision to name themselves Louis the Child after landing on the historic figure while seeking out inspiration through use of the "Random Article" button on Wikipedia.

Musical influences
Hauldren cites Madeon, Flume, Porter Robinson, and Odesza as musical influences.

Discography

Studio albums

Mixtapes

Extended plays

Singles

As lead artist

As featured artist

Other charted songs

Remixes

Notes

References

External links 
 

Musical groups from Chicago
Electronic music groups from Illinois
American electronic dance music groups
American electronic music duos
Musical groups established in 2013
2013 establishments in Illinois
Future bass musicians
American DJs
Electronic dance music duos
Interscope Records artists